George Kent Shuler (December 15, 1884 – October 16, 1942) was an American war hero and politician.

Military career
Shuler fought in World War I as a member of the United States Marine Corps, finishing the war with a Navy Distinguished Service Medal and the rank of captain. He was later promoted to the rank of major. On July 30, 1922, while still a captain, he commanded the detachment of four or five Marines that was dispatched by Secretary of the Interior Albert Fall to evict a drilling rig crew belonging to the Mutual Oil Company from the Teapot Dome oil field in Natrona County, Wyoming, thus precipitating one of the most notable scandals of the administration of President Warren G. Harding. The eviction proceeded without incident; the officials of the company even provided lunch to Captain Shuler and the men of his detachment after drilling operations had ceased.

Political career
Shuler ran for Congress in New York's 36th congressional district in 1920, but was defeated by Norman J. Gould. He was New York State Treasurer from 1923 to 1924, elected in 1922 but defeated for re-election in 1924 by Republican Lewis H. Pounds. He was a delegate to the 1924 Democratic National Convention.

Personal life
Shuler lived at Lyons, in Wayne County, New York. He married Blanche Stewart, and they had two daughters

References

See also

 Political Graveyard
 List of recipients, at Home of the Heroes
 His candidacy for Lt. Gov announced, mentioning his war heroism, in NYT on September 25, 1922
 The Dem. ticket, in NYT on September 30, 1922

1884 births
1942 deaths
New York State Treasurers
People from Lyons, New York
United States Marine Corps officers
Recipients of the Navy Distinguished Service Medal
20th-century American politicians